Charles Bierbauer (born July 22, 1942) is a former professor and dean of the College of Mass Communications and Information Studies at the University of South Carolina. He was for many years CNN’s senior Washington correspondent and a veteran reporter covering national and international affairs.

As a CNN correspondent, Bierbauer reported on five presidential campaigns and served as CNN's senior White House correspondent for almost a decade during the Reagan and Bush Administrations. He has traveled with American presidents to all 50 states and more than 30 nations.

Early life and education
Charles Bierbauer was born July 22, 1942, in Allentown, Pennsylvania. He is a graduate of Emmaus High School in Emmaus, Pennsylvania and Penn State, where he earned three degrees, a bachelor's degree in Russian, a bachelor's degree in journalism, and a master's degree in journalism. Penn State has named him a distinguished alumnus and alumni fellow.

Career
Bierbauer's joined the 7217th Air Division, where he was assigned to Sinop, Turkey in 1962–1963 while with the Army Security Agency. At Sinop, he was part of a cadre of young soldiers who worked wiring the remote base for radio. Bierbauer reported news, did play-by-play base sports, and hosted a jazz show. He started his commercial broadcast career as a radio reporter for WKAP radio in Allentown, Pennsylvania in 1963. He also worked in print journalism, writing for The Morning Call in Allentown.

He was a reporter with the Associated Press in Pittsburgh from 1967 to 1968, and a Chicago Daily News correspondent in Bonn, Germany. He joined Group W in 1969 as its Eastern European correspondent based in Vienna, Austria, and transferred to Bonn, Germany, in 1970, continuing to cover Germany and Eastern Europe.  In 1974, he became Group W's foreign editor based in London. In 1976, Group W assigned Bierbauer as a television reporter at KYW, its Philadelphia station, where he remained through 1977.

Bierbauer was an overseas correspondent for ABC News from 1977 to 1981, serving first as Moscow bureau chief and later as the Bonn bureau chief.

Bierbauer joined CNN in 1981 and remained there for over 20 years, leaving the network in 2001. He was CNN's Pentagon correspondent from 1981 to 1984, its senior White House correspondent from 1984 to 1993, and senior Washington correspondent from 1993 to 2001. From 1997 to 2001, he covered the U.S. Supreme Court and legal affairs.

In 2001, he was reporter and producer for a Discovery Channel documentary on the September 11 attacks.

He served as a member of the National Council for Media & Public Affairs at George Washington University and is on the advisory board for the Washington Center for Politics and Journalism.

In 1997, he won an Emmy Award for anchoring CNN coverage of the Centennial Olympic Park bombing in Atlanta. He also is a recipient of the CableACE Award from the Association for Cable Excellence and the Overseas Press Club Award for Group W's reporting on the Yom Kippur War.

College dean
Bierbauer became the first dean of the newly merged College of Mass Communications and Information Studies at the University of South Carolina in Columbia, South Carolina in July 2002 and served in that position until August 2017. While in Washington, D.C., he was a lecturer for the Penn State program in Washington and a member of the College of Communications Board of Visitors and the alumni association's Communications Advisory Board.

Family
Bierbauer is of German descent and is married to Susanne Schafer, an Associated Press reporter and formerly AP's Pentagon correspondent. He has four children and eight grandchildren.

References

External links

1942 births
Living people
CNN people
American television reporters and correspondents
Emmaus High School alumni
Donald P. Bellisario College of Communications alumni
Educators from Allentown, Pennsylvania
Journalists from Pennsylvania
University of South Carolina faculty